Stammheim is a municipality in the district of Andelfingen in the canton of Zürich in Switzerland. On 1 January 2019 the former municipalities of Oberstammheim, Unterstammheim and Waltalingen merged into the new municipality of Stammheim.

History

Oberstammheim
In 2009, archaeologists announced the discovery of an Iron Age (late Hallstatt or early La Tène) tumulus burial, apparently of a Celtic nobleman. While there are comparable finds in Germany, the site is unique in Switzerland.

Oberstammheim is first mentioned in 761 as Stamhaim.  In 1212 it was mentioned as in Stamehein superiori.

Geography

Demographics

Historic Population
The historical population is given in the following chart:

References

External links 

Municipalities of the canton of Zürich